Mai Sehra Bandh Ke Aaunga is a 2017 Indian Bhojpuri language comedy romance drama film written and directed by Rajnish Mishra and produced by Anil Kabra and Pradeep Singh. The stars Khesari Lal Yadav and Kajal Raghwani in lead role while Awadhesh Mishra, Sanjay Pandey, Priyanka Pandit, Dev Singh, Deepak Sinha, Gopal Rai, Dhama Verma, Rohit Singh Matru, Sanjay Mahanand and  Kiran Yadav in supporting roles. 'Main Sehra Bandh Ke Aaunga' movie released on YouTube on 13 April 2018, and has become a hit.

Cast
Khesari Lal Yadav as Raju
Kajal Raghwani as Pooja
Awadhesh Mishra as Devanand (Raju's Brother)
Sanjay Pandey as (Raju's Brother)
 Dev Singh as Babua Ji
 Anand Mohan Pandey as Pandit Ji
 Sanjay Mahanand as Shanichar
 Gopal Rai as Satyanarayan (Raju's Father)
 Deepak Sinha as Pooja's Father
 Kiran Yadav as Raju's Mother
 Priyanka Pandit as Rinki
 Dhama Verma as Babua's henchman
 Rohit Singh Matru as Raju's Friend
 Suman Jha as Raju's Sister
 Mahi Singh as Pooja's Friend
 Pallavi Koli as Pooja's Friend

Production
Filming of this film was done at Lucky Studio, Halol, Gujarat with some scenes shot in Nandan Van, Mumbai.

The film designed by Ananjay Raghuraj while sound designed by Satish Pujari (Audio Lab) and dress designed by Badshah Khan. Choreography is by Kanu Mukharjee, Rikki Gupta and Rajeev Dinkar. Art direction done by Shiv Shankar Patel (Munna). It was edited by Jeetendra Singh (Jeetu) while action direction by Baji Rao. VFX done by Pratik Singh. Editing and dubbing done by "Audio Lab".

Release
The film was theatrically released on 18 October 2017 (Chhath Puja) at all theatres of Bihar and Jharkhand and received a warm response.

Soundtrack

The soundtrack for "Mai Sehra Bandh Ke Aaunga" was composed by Rajnish Mishra with lyrics penned by Pyare Lal Yadav, Azad Singh, Shyam Dehati and Pawan Pandey. The soundtrack included an unusually large number of songs at 9. It was produced under the "SRK Music".

His first song "Lachke Kamariya Tohar Lahe Lahe" released on 21 November 2017, second song "Haradiya Kaam Na Kari Taza" released on 24 December 2017 and third song "Muski Maar Ke Je Bolela Karejau" released on 3 March 2018 at official YouTube handle of "SRK Music" and got 12 millions, 19 millions and 25 million views respectively. All song of this film are hit on YouTube.

Marketing
The trailer of this film was released on 30 September 2017 at official YouTube channel of "SRK Music" and got 5.2 million views.

The film was streamed at YouTube on 14 April 2018 and quickly became a trending video. It acquired 5.7 million views within four days. As of May 2020, the film has amassed over 92 million views on YouTube.

References

2017 films
2010s Bhojpuri-language films